The 1971 Auckland City mayoral election was part of the New Zealand local elections held that same year. In 1971, elections were held for the Mayor of Auckland plus other local government positions including twenty-one city councillors. The polling was conducted using the standard first-past-the-post electoral method.

Background
Incumbent Mayor Dove-Myer Robinson was re-elected with an overwhelming majority with an absence of a challenger from either the Citizens & Ratepayers Association's ticket or the Labour Party. Despite deciding to run full tickets for the city council and regional authority the Auckland regional council of the Labour Party resolved to support Robinson for mayor as it had in 1968 to prevent the possibility of a conservative mayor being elected. Despite opposing Robinson's rapid rail proposals the Civic Action Party did not contest the election against him. Robinson's closest polling opponent was Paul Wedderspoon a university student, who campaigned as an independent on a socialist platform.

Mayoralty results

Councillor results

References

Mayoral elections in Auckland
1971 elections in New Zealand
Politics of the Auckland Region
1970s in Auckland
October 1971 events in New Zealand